Crashland were a British indie band  signed to the Independiente record label.

Singer Alex Troup and drummer Marc Childs met at school in Monmouth when they were 14.  In October 1996, bassist Martin Maddaford was added to the line-up after answering an ad in Melody Maker. The band was signed to Independiente on 4 June 1998.  The group's sound was very similar to Weezer, Dodgy and early Radiohead. Their debut album Glued, released in 2000 contained 12 tracks. Each are around three minutes in duration, showing their preference for radio-friendly indie tracks, fashionable in the Britpop era. Crashland released two singles, "Modern Animal" and "New Perfume" and an EP, The Devoted.

Crashland was formed from the remnants of Scorched Earth, which comprised Alex Troup on lead guitar, brother Andy Troup on vocals, Paul Lounds on bass guitar, Joe Atkinson on rhythm guitar, Jamie Ashton on keyboards and Marc Childs on drums.

Alex Troup has since moved to the US and has a new band, Troup.

Discography

Albums

Singles

See also
Alternative music

References

British indie rock groups
Welsh rock music groups
Independiente Records artists